Allium rude is a Chinese species of wild onion native to Gansu, Qinghai, Sichuan, and Tibet, at elevations of 2700–5000 m.

Allium rude produces one egg-shaped bulb up to 15 mm in diameter. Scape is up to 70 cm long, round in cross-section. Leaves are flat, long and narrow, usually shorter than the scape, up to 10 mm across. Umbels are spherical with large numbers of yellow flowers crowded together.

References

rude
Onions
Flora of China
Plants described in 1980